The women's 3000 metres event  at the 1994 European Athletics Indoor Championships was held in Palais Omnisports de Paris-Bercy on 11 March.

Results

References

3000 metres at the European Athletics Indoor Championships
3000
1994 in women's athletics